At the 1924 Winter Olympics, only one bobsleigh event was contested, the four man event. However, rules at the time also allowed a fifth sledder to compete. The event was held on Saturday and Sunday, 2 and 3 February 1924.

Medalists

Results

Participating nations

A total of 39 bobsledders from five nations competed at the Chamonix Games:

Medal table

References

External links
1924 bobsleigh four-man results
1924 Olympic Games official report (digitized copy online)
International Olympic Committee results database

 
1924 Winter Olympics
1924 Winter Olympics events
Olympics
Bobsleigh in France